Gabriel de Lorges, Count of Montgomery, Lord of Lorges and Ducey (5 May 153026 June 1574), was a French nobleman of Scottish extraction and captain of the Scots Guard of King Henry II of France. He is remembered for mortally injuring Henry II in a jousting accident and subsequently converting to Protestantism, the faith that the Scots Guard sought to suppress. He became a leader of the Huguenots. In French-language contexts, his name is spelled Montgommery.

Career
On 30 June 1559, during a jousting match to celebrate the Peace of Cateau Cambrésis between Henry II and his longtime Habsburg enemies, and two major marriages, namely that of Marguerite, the king's sister, with the Duke of Savoy Emmanuel-Philibert, and that of Elisabeth, the king's eldest daughter, with Philip II, king of Spain, a splinter of wood from Montgomery's shattered lance pierced Henry's eye and entered his brain, fatally injuring him. From his deathbed Henry absolved Montgomery of any blame, before dying on 10 July 1559. However, finding himself disgraced, Montgomery retreated to his estates in Normandy. There he studied theology and converted to Protestantism, making him an enemy of the state.

In 1562, Montgomery allied himself with another Protestant convert, Louis I de Bourbon, prince de Condé. He was one of the few refugees to survive the St. Bartholomew's Day massacre after a wounded Huguenot swam across the Seine to warn him that rioting had begun. He took control of Bourges and during September and October defended Rouen from the Royal Army. A price was put on his head, but he managed to escape to England. The queen mother, Catherine de' Medici, asked Queen Elizabeth I for his extradition, but Elizabeth refused.

Montgomery returned to France with a fleet in an attempt to relieve the Siege of La Rochelle in 1573. The following year he attempted an insurrection in Normandy, but was captured, taken to Paris, and sentenced to death. On 26 June 1574, as he was about to be beheaded, Montgomery was informed that a royal edict had proclaimed that his property would be confiscated and his children deprived of their titles.

A freely adapted version of Montgomery's life is told in Alexandre Dumas' novel The Two Dianas.

Marriage and issue
He married (1550) Isabeau de La Touche (died 1593), by whom he had four sons and four daughters:

Sons
 Jacques I de Montgomery (1551–1560)
 Gédéon de Montgomery (died 1596)
 Gilles de Montgomery (1558–1596)
 Gabriel II de Montgomery (1565–1635), who built the Château de Ducey, and was father to six children:
 Louise de Montgomery
 Gabriel III de Montgomery (1595–1635)
 Suzanne de Montgomery
 Louis I de Montgomery (1601–1682)
 Jean de Montgomery (1605–1694)
 Jacques III de Montgomery (1609–1682)

Daughters
 Suzanne de Montgomery
 Elisabeth de Montgomery
 Claude de Montgomery
 Roberte de Montgomery, wife of Gawen Champernowne (died 1591) of Dartington in Devon, by whom she had issue. In 1582 she divorced him for adultery and in 1595 married Thomas Horner of Cloford.

Notes

References

External links 
 

16th-century executions by France
1530 births
1574 deaths
Converts to Calvinism from Roman Catholicism
Counts of Montgomery
Executed people from Normandy
French people of Scottish descent
French people of the French Wars of Religion
French refugees
French soldiers
Garde Écossaise officers
Huguenots
People executed by France by decapitation
People executed for treason
Court of Henry II of France